Odell Township is located in Livingston County, Illinois. As of the 2010 census, its population was 1,276 and it contained 551 housing units.

Geography

Demographics

References

External links
 US Census
 City-data.com
 Illinois State Archives

Townships in Livingston County, Illinois
Populated places established in 1857
Townships in Illinois
1857 establishments in Illinois